Fundurii Vechi is a village in Glodeni District, Moldova. It is also known as "Fundury", "Fundur'", "Funduri-Vechi" and "Staryye Fundury". The first document attesting its existence dates to 18 April 1581.

Notable people
 Igor Klipii

References

Villages of Glodeni District